Yağızköy, historically Delhemi, is a village in the Elbeyli District, Kilis Province, Turkey. The village is inhabited by Turkmens of the Elbegli tribe and Abdals of the Kuyucular tribe and had a population of 246 in 2022.

In late 19th century, German orientalist Martin Hartmann listed the village as a settlement of 10 houses inhabited by Turks.

References

Villages in Elbeyli District